Ceroxys is a genus of picture-winged flies in the family Ulidiidae.

Species 
Ceroxys amurensis Hennig, 1939
Ceroxys baneai Gheorghiu, 1994
Ceroxys cinifera (Loew, 1846)
Ceroxys confluens (Becker, 1907)
Ceroxys confusa (Becker, 1912)
Ceroxys connexa (Becker, 1907)
Ceroxys flavoscutellata (Hendel, 1935)
Ceroxys fraudulosa (Loew, 1864)
Ceroxys friasi Steyskal, 1991
Ceroxys hyalinata (Panzer, 1798)
Ceroxys laticornis (Loew, 1873)
Ceroxys latiusculus (Loew, 1873)
Ceroxys morosa (Loew, 1873)
Ceroxys munda (Loew, 1868)
Ceroxys pallidus Steyskal, 1991
Ceroxys robusta (Loew, 1873)
Ceroxys splendens (Becker, 1907)
Ceroxys unimaculata (Czerny, 1909)
Ceroxys urticae (Linnaeus, 1758)
Ceroxys zaidami (Becker, 1907)

References

External links 
 
 
 Ceroxys at insectoid.info

 
Brachycera genera
Taxa named by Pierre-Justin-Marie Macquart